Worawa Aboriginal College is a private boarding school for Aboriginal girls in Healesville, Victoria, Australia.

History
The school was established by Hyllus Maris in 1983. It was shut down in December 2007 for failing to meet minimum registration requirements, but was re-opened in May 2008.

Description
Worawa is an all-girls boarding school catering for young Aboriginal women in Years 7 to 12.

Ambassadors
, ambassadors for the college include Angela Bates, Executive Producer of NITV Current Affairs; actor Deborah Mailman; lawyer Abigail Burchill; and AFL umpire Glenn James. In 2015 Anita Heiss became an ambassador for the school, but she is not listed on the Ambassadors' web page.

References

External links
 

Boarding schools in Victoria (Australia)
Private schools in Victoria (Australia)
Alliance of Girls' Schools Australasia
Girls' schools in Victoria (Australia)
Indigenous Australians in Victoria (Australia)
Buildings and structures in the Shire of Yarra Ranges